Hell-Bent for Frisco is a 1931 American pre-Code action film directed by Stuart Paton and starring Charles Delaney, Vera Reynolds and Carroll Nye.

Synopsis
After his girlfriend's brother is murdered, a San Francisco newspapermen goes on the track of his killers.

Cast
 Charles Delaney as Jimmy Gray 
 Vera Reynolds as Ellen Garwood 
 Carroll Nye as Lane Garwood 
 Wesley Barry as The Newsboy 
 William Desmond as The Editor 
 Edmund Burns as Frank Kenton 
 Reed Howes as Red 
 Charles Craig as Dr. Clayton 
 Richard Cramer as Nick 
 George Regas as Tony 
 Tom O'Brien as Fogarty

References

Bibliography
 Darby, William. Masters of Lens and Light: A Checklist of Major Cinematographers and Their Feature Films. Scarecrow Press, 1991.

External links
 

1931 films
1930s action films
American black-and-white films
American action films
Films directed by Stuart Paton
Films set in San Francisco
1930s English-language films
1930s American films